Joseph Francis Stewart (1889 – 6 May 1964) was an Irish nationalist politician.

After growing up in Dungannon, where he studied at the Christian Brothers' School, Stewart worked as a wine merchant and became active in the Irish Parliamentary Party. At the January 1910 general election he worked as the election agent for Thomas Kettle.

In 1923 Stewart was elected to the Dungannon Board of Governors, a post he held until the Board was dissolved in 1948. He was also elected to Tyrone County Council for the Nationalist Party, was a long-time member of Dungannon Urban District Council, and was the President of the Tyrone Ancient Order of Hibernians.

At the 1929 general election Stewart was elected to Stormont for the seat of East Tyrone, which he held until his death in 1964.

Following the death of Joseph Devlin, Stewart was elected to Westminster at the 1934 Fermanagh and Tyrone by-election, but he stood down at the following year's general election.

In 1958 Stewart became the Chairman of the Nationalist Party at Stormont, a position he retained until his death.

References

1889 births
1964 deaths
Leaders of political parties in Northern Ireland
Members of the House of Commons of Northern Ireland 1929–1933
Members of the House of Commons of Northern Ireland 1933–1938
Members of the House of Commons of Northern Ireland 1938–1945
Members of the House of Commons of Northern Ireland 1945–1949
Members of the House of Commons of Northern Ireland 1949–1953
Members of the House of Commons of Northern Ireland 1953–1958
Members of the House of Commons of Northern Ireland 1958–1962
Members of the House of Commons of Northern Ireland 1962–1965
Members of the Parliament of the United Kingdom for Fermanagh and Tyrone (1922–1950)
Nationalist Party (Ireland) members of the House of Commons of Northern Ireland
UK MPs 1931–1935
People from Dungannon
Members of Tyrone County Council
Members of the House of Commons of Northern Ireland for County Tyrone constituencies
Politicians from County Tyrone